Hyman Jack Averback (October 21, 1920  – October 14, 1997) was an American radio, television, and film actor who eventually became a producer and director.

Early years
Born in Minneapolis, Averback moved to California with his family when he was nine years old. Averback graduated from the Edward Clark Academy Theater in 1938 and eventually got a job announcing at KMPC Beverly Hills before World War II.

Career

Radio
During World War II, as part of the Armed Forces Radio Service, he entertained troops in the Pacific with his program of comedy and music, where he created the character of Tokyo Mose, a lampoon of Japan's Tokyo Rose. After his discharge, his big break came when he was hired to announce the Jack Paar radio show, which replaced Jack Benny for the summer beginning June 1, 1947. He became the announcer for Bob Hope on NBC in September 1948 and announced for other NBC radio shows, The Sealtest Village Store and Let's Talk Hollywood, as well as on the Sweeney and March show on CBS in 1948 and appeared as the voice of Newsweek magazine on a weekly radio show on ABC West Coast stations the same year.

Averback was also an actor, appearing a number of times on the Jack Benny radio show, beginning in January 1948.

In 1952, Averback starred in Secret Mission, a transcribed program "dealing with factual stories of escape from behind the Iron Curtain" on AFRS. In 1955 he joined the ensemble cast of Yours Truly, Johnny Dollar, playing multiple character roles in support of leading actor Bob Bailey.

Television
Doing comedy on early television, he  appeared on The Saturday Night Revue (1953–54), Tonight (1955) and NBC Comedy Hour (1956). He was a series regular as Mr. Romero on the Eve Arden sitcom Our Miss Brooks and appeared on I Love Lucy and other 1950s comedies, then moved into directing at the end of the decade. He directed The Real McCoys with Richard Crenna. Crenna had been a cast member with Averback on Our Miss Brooks.

Averback also directed for The Dick Powell Show (1961–1963), Burke's Law (1963-1964), The Man from U.N.C.L.E. (1964–1968), The Flying Nun (1967–1970), Columbo: Suitable for Framing (1971), McCloud (1971), M*A*S*H (1972), Needles and Pins (1973), Quark (1977-1978), the miniseries Pearl (1978), Matt Houston (1982–1983), The Four Seasons (1984), Murder, She Wrote (1985), and The Last Precinct (1986). For CBS, he produced Mrs. G. Goes to College (aka The Gertrude Berg Show) in the 1961–1962 season.

He co-produced the popular 1960s sitcom F Troop and supplied the voice over the loudspeaker heard on the television series M*A*S*H. His actual recording from a Bob Hope show was used in M*A*S*H episode 63, "Bombed," from season 3 where he announces himself as Hope's announcer.

Film
Averback co-narrated The Story of Life, a 62-minute sex educational film, released by Crusader Productions in June 1948. It featured live action as well as animation by former Walt Disney artists Lester Novros and Robert Moore.

Film credits include his acting as Willard Alexander in The Benny Goodman Story (1956) and directing Chamber of Horrors (1966), Where Were You When the Lights Went Out? (1968), I Love You, Alice B. Toklas (1968), The Great Bank Robbery (1969), and Suppose They Gave a War and Nobody Came (1970) as well as the TV movie The New Maverick (1978) with James Garner and Jack Kelly.

Personal life
In 1969, Averback bought a home in the Racquet Club Estates neighborhood of Palm Springs, California, 

He died on October 14, 1997, a week before his 77th birthday, and was buried in Westwood Memorial Park.

References

External links
 Armed Forces Radio Service
 

1920 births
1997 deaths
20th-century American male actors
American male film actors
American male radio actors
American male television actors
American television directors
Burials at Westwood Village Memorial Park Cemetery
Directors Guild of America Award winners
Film directors from California
Film directors from Minnesota
Male actors from Los Angeles
Male actors from Minneapolis
Male actors from Palm Springs, California
Radio and television announcers
Television producers from California